Devo is an American rock band formed in 1973.

Devo may also refer to:
 Devo 2.0, a spin-off teen pop band created by the band Devo
 Magnus "Devo" Andersson, bassist for Swedish black metal band Marduk
 Devon White (baseball), a former baseball player
 Devo Springsteen, a songwriter and producer
 Evolutionary developmental biology, abbreviated as evo-devo